Richard Barber was the member of Parliament for Great Grimsby in 1388 and mayor of that town.

References 

Mayors of Grimsby
Year of birth missing
Year of death missing
English MPs September 1388
Members of the Parliament of England for Great Grimsby